Allied Domecq PLC was an international company, headquartered in Bristol, United Kingdom, that operated spirits, wine, and quick service restaurant businesses. It was once a FTSE 100 Index constituent but has been acquired by Pernod Ricard. They had one distillery in India.

History
Allied Domecq was the result of a 1994 merger between Allied Lyons and Pedro Domecq S.A.  Allied Lyons itself was the result of a 1978 merger between Allied Breweries and the food and catering group J. Lyons and Co.

In early 2005, a takeover bid for the company was launched by French-based rival Pernod Ricard S.A. Pernod Ricard successfully completed acquisition on 26 July 2005 and sold off the overlapping spirits brands to U.S.-based competitor Fortune Brands and British-based multinational Diageo. On 12 December 2005, Pernod Ricard announced that it had agreed to sell the restaurant businesses (Dunkin' Brands) to a consortium of three US private equity firms (Thomas H. Lee Partners, the Carlyle Group and Bain Capital LLP) for $2.43 billion. The closing of the sale occurred on 1 March 2006.

Portfolio at time of takeover
Allied Domecq's spirits division operated a combination of nine core global brands, plus a selection of local market leaders. Their product portfolio included:

 Ballantine's whisky
 Teacher's Highland Cream whisky
 Laphroaig, a malt whisky from Islay
 Scapa distillery
 Courvoisier cognac
 Canadian Club whisky
 Kahlúa coffee liqueur
 Malibu, a coconut-flavoured rum-based spirit
 Maker's Mark, a Kentucky bourbon whiskey
 Montana Wines, a large New Zealand wine producer.
 Mumm champagne
 Perrier-Jouët champagne
 Don Pedro Brandy
 Stolichnaya vodka
 Tia Maria liqueur
 Cockburn's Port
 Harvey's Bristol Cream sherry
 Curtis No. 1 whisky

Brands acquired by Fortune Brands:
 Sauza Tequila
 Courvoisier cognac
 Canadian Club whisky
 Clos du Bois and other Sonoma and Napa wine brands
 Laphroaig malt whisky
 Maker's Mark bourbon
 Teacher's Highland Cream whisky
 Cockburn's port
 Harvey's Bristol Cream sherry
 Larios gin
 DYC whisky
 Fundador Spanish brandy
 Centenario Spanish brandy
 Kuemmerling German bitters

References

Defunct companies of England
Drink companies of England
Holding companies of the United Kingdom
Pernod Ricard brands
Defunct companies based in Bristol
British companies established in 1994
Holding companies established in 1994
Food and drink companies established in 1994
Food and drink companies disestablished in 2005
1994 establishments in England
2005 disestablishments in England
Companies formerly listed on the London Stock Exchange